Babulal Jain (British Raj, 17 November 1934 – 6 August 2021) was an Indian politician of Bharatiya Janata Party. He was a minister in Government of Madhya Pradesh and a leader of the Janata Party. He was also MP State Planning Commission Vice-chairman.  He was elected to the state assembly from Ujjain Uttar constituency.

References

People from Ujjain
1934 births
2021 deaths
Bharatiya Janata Party politicians from Madhya Pradesh
21st-century Indian politicians
Madhya Pradesh MLAs 1977–1980
Politicians from Ujjain
State cabinet ministers of Madhya Pradesh